The R371 is a Regional Route in South Africa that connects Windsorton with the N14 to Kuruman and Vryburg.

Route
Its northern terminus at the N14 is in North West. It heads south to Reivilo. Here it meets the R372 from the east. The two continue south out of the town. After eight kilometres, the latter heads west again. The R371 continues south, but bends south-south-east, and crosses the Northern Cape / North West border five times, emerging in the Northern Cape, before reaching the R370. The two are briefly co-signed heading south-west, before the R371 diverges again heading south-south-east to end at the R374, just west of Windsorton.

External links
 Routes Travel Info

References

Regional Routes in the Northern Cape
Regional Routes in North West (South African province)